Abbas Zaryab or 'Abbās Zaryāb (full name: Abbas (Zaryab) Khoyi ; August 13, 1919 – February 3, 1995) was a historian, translator, literature Professor and Iranologist. He was the author of several books, including a life of Muhammad, and articles in The Persian Encyclopedia (published in Iran), Western peer reviewed Journals as well as Iranica.

Biography
Abbas Zaryab Khoi was born in Khoy, West Azerbaijan in Iran. From an early age, he showed an exceptional talent and memory, becoming distinguished among his classmates. Through a distinguished academic achievement, he was given a free scholarship to Germany. He obtained his doctorate from Mainz University in Germany from the history department. His Ph.D. thesis covered the topic of Timur's successor according to the book: Tarikh-e-Kabir Ja'fari. He had mastery over the Persian language, Azerbaijani language, Arabic language and European languages such as German, English and French.

Among the distinguished rank he held, was the head of the library of congress in Iran and the head of the literature department at Tehran University. At the invitation of the eminent Iranologist, Professor Walter Bruno Henning, he taught Persian language and literature in University of California, Berkeley between 1962 and 1964. But he came back to Iran, due to his love for his homeland and took a position at Tehran University. He died in 1995.

His works are quoted in Western publications and by Western scholars including Franklin Lewis, Charles Melville, G. Michael Wickens, Juan Cole, Kamran Ekbal, Lutz Richter-Bernburg, Josef van Ess, H. R. Roemer, etc.

Books and articles

Non-Persian languages
Some selected writing of his in non-Persian languages.

 'A. Zaryāb, ĀḠĀJĪ BOḴĀRĪ in Encyclopædia Iranica
 'A. Zaryab ĀḠĀJĪ, in Encyclopædia Iranica
 'A. Zaryab BOKAYR B. MĀHĀN in Encyclopædia Iranica
 Charles Melville and 'A. Zaryab Chobanids in Encyclopædia Iranica
 'A. Zaryab EDUCATION v. THE MADRASA IN SHI'ITE PERSIA in Encyclopædia Iranica
 'A. Zaryab IRAQ ii iii. FROM THE MONGOLS TO THE SAFAVIDS in Encyclopædia Iranica
 "Bukayr B. Maham Marvazi", Encyclopædia Iranica, vol. IV, London 1990, p. 332.
 Zaryāb Ḵo'ī, "Ebn-e Rāvandī" in DMBE III, pp. 531–39
 'A. Zaryab, Der Bericht über die Nachfolger Timurs aus dem Ta'rīḫ-i kabīr des Ğa'farī ibn Muḥammad al-Ḥusainī, Ph.D. thesis, Mainz, 1960.
 'A. Zaryab,. Fakhr Razi und die Frage des Seins. Spektrum Iran. Bonn. 1988 1/3: 14–24.
 "Ein Wiederaufgefundnes Werk Abu Hayyan al-Tanhidis", A Lpccust's Leg, London 1962, pp. 246–250.
 'A. Zaryab, "Struggle of Religious sects in the Ilkhanid Court" La Persianel Medioevo, Roma, Accademia Nazionale dei Lincei, 1971, pp. 465–466.

Persian
Zaryab Khoi had over 100+ publications in Persian.

References

External links
 An article on Nezami Ganjavi : Abbas Zaryab Khoi,"Nezami Ganjavi Tork Naboodeh ast" (Nezami Ganjavi was not Turkish) in Ayandeh Magazine, Esfand Maah (February–March), 1324 (1945), pages 780–781. (Iran)
 وبگاه بنياد دائره المعارف اسلامی
 وبگاه كانون ایرانی پژوهشگران فلسفه و حكمت
 Dr. Abbas Zaryab Khoi in Persian
 in Persian

Iranian Iranologists
1919 births
People from Khoy
University of California, Berkeley faculty
Johannes Gutenberg University Mainz alumni
Iranian expatriates in the United States
Iranian expatriates in Germany
1995 deaths
Burials at artist's block of Behesht-e Zahra
20th-century Iranian historians
Academic staff of the University of Tehran
Faculty of Theology and Islamic Studies of the University of Tehran alumni